Aristides Brezina (4 May 1848 – 25 May 1909) was an Austrian mineralogist born in Vienna.

In 1872 he graduated from the University of Tübingen, and afterwards taught crystallography at the University of Vienna. In 1878 he succeeded Austrian mineralogist Gustav Tschermak (1836-1927) as custodian of the meteorite collection at Vienna, and from 1889 until 1896 he was director of the Mineralogisch-Petrographische Abteilung (Department of Mineralogy-Petrography). In 1886, he was elected as a member to the American Philosophical Society.

Brezina is known for his study of meteorites, and with German mineralogist Gustav Rose (1798-1873) and Tschermak, he was co-architect of the "Rose-Tschermak-Brezina classification" system for meteorites. It was largely based on criteria such as texture and color, and was widely used from the mid-1880s to around 1920 when a simpler method of classification was proposed by George Thurland Prior.

Brezinaite, a mineral found in meteorites, is named after him.

Bibliography

 Brezina, A. (1904), "The Arrangement of Collections of Meteorites", Proceedings of the American Philosophical Society, Vol.43, No.176, (April 1904), pp.211-247.

See also
 Glossary of meteoritics
 "The New Museum Idea"

References 

 Biographies of Mineralogists
 

1848 births
1909 deaths
Austrian mineralogists
Scientists from Vienna
University of Tübingen alumni
Academic staff of the University of Vienna
Meteorite researchers
Members of the American Philosophical Society